Brad Gesimondo, commonly known as Brad Mondo (born October 28, 1994), is an American hairstylist, entrepreneur and social media personality.

Early life
Mondo was born in Franklin, Massachusetts on October 28, 1994. He has two brothers, Eric and John. In his childhood, he followed in his father's footsteps as a hairstylist. He started his YouTube career at the age of 12 and was a sales associate with Calvin Klein. Brad is openly gay.

Career
Mondo became popular through his "Hairdresser Reacts" videos on social media and educational videos on hair styling. He has also styled celebrities such as Charli D'Amelio, Vanessa Hudgens, Heather Marks, and Shay Mitchell.

Mondo founded the hair care products brand XMondo Hair in 2019 and launched XMondo Color in November 2020. He won the Hair Influencer of the Year award at the 2020 American Influencer Awards.

References

1994 births
Living people
People from Franklin, Massachusetts
American YouTubers
LGBT YouTubers
YouTube vloggers
American TikTokers
American hairdressers
20th-century LGBT people
21st-century LGBT people
YouTube channels launched in 2015
LGBT TikTokers